Eslamabad (also Romanized as Eslāmābād; also known as Dargī) is a village in the Gowharan District, Bashagard County, Hormozgan Province, Iran. At the 2006 census, its population was 129, in 25 families.

References 

Populated places in Bashagard County